The Sărata is a left tributary of the river Ialomița in Romania. It discharges into the Ialomița in Urziceni. It flows through the villages Sărata-Monteoru, Ulmeni, Movila Banului, Mihăilești, Glodeanu Sărat, Armășești, and Bărbulești.

Tributaries
The following rivers are tributaries to the river Sărata (from source to mouth):

Left: Glaveș
Right: Pietroasa, Năianca, Ghighiu, Toți

References

Rivers of Romania
Rivers of Buzău County
Rivers of Ialomița County